Glenn Russell Dubin (born April 13, 1957) is an American billionaire hedge fund manager and the Principal of Dubin & Co. LP, a private investment company. He is the co-founder of Highbridge Capital Management, an alternative asset management company based in New York City, and a founding board member of the Robin Hood Foundation.

Early life
Glenn Russell Dubin was born to a middle-class family in the Washington Heights section of upper Manhattan. He is the oldest son of Harvey and Edith Dubin. His father, Harvey (1926–2011), a Russian Jew, was a taxi driver, who later worked in dress manufacturing. His mother, Edith Dubin (1928–2019), was an Austrian Jewish immigrant who worked as a hospital administrator.

Dubin attended public school at Washington Heights' P.S. 132 and went on to attend college at Stony Brook University, where he graduated in 1978 with a degree in economics. He was also a member of the school's football team and lacrosse club.  In May 2012, Dubin was the keynote speaker at Stony Brook University's commencement, and was conferred the honorary degree of Doctor of Letters for his contributions to the field of finance and philanthropy.

Career
Dubin began his career in finance as a retail stock broker at E. F. Hutton & Co. in 1978. At E. F. Hutton & Co. Dubin met and worked with Paul Tudor Jones.

In 1984, Glenn Dubin and his childhood friend Henry Swieca co-founded Dubin & Swieca Capital Management. The company was an early fund of funds business that constructed multi-manager hedge fund portfolios guided by the principles of modern portfolio theory. In 2005, the firm was renamed Corbin Capital Partners, as Dubin and Swieca were no longer involved in the day-to-day management of the company. The new name reportedly originated from an intersection in Washington Heights where the founders first met when they were 5 years old.

In 1992, Dubin and Swieca founded Highbridge Capital Management with $35 million in capital, naming the institutional alternative-asset management firm after the 19th Century aqueduct that connects Washington Heights with the Bronx. In late 2004, J.P. Morgan Asset Management—a division of JPMorgan Chase—purchased a majority interest in Highbridge for $1.3 billion. The Financial Times reported in 2006 that JPMorgan paid Glenn Dubin "an estimated $1bn in 2004" for his majority stake in Highbridge Capital Management.

In 2006, Highbridge invested as a joint venture in Louis Dreyfus Group to increase their access to and control of energy delivery within trading markets.

In July 2009, J.P. Morgan Asset Management completed its purchase of substantially all remaining shares of the firm. After the purchase, Dubin remained Highbridge's chief executive.

In October 2012, it was announced that Dubin, Paul Tudor Jones and Timothy Barakett were among a group of investors buying the merchant energy operation, then called Louis Dreyfus Highbridge Energy ("LDH Energy"), and renamed the firm Castleton Commodities International, LLC.

In 2013, Dubin founded the quantitative-trading firm Engineers Gate Manager LP. The company along with Dubin's family office are headquartered at Hudson Yards. In January 2020, Dubin announced he was retiring from the hedge fund industry after four decades to focus on private investments through his family office, Dubin & Co.

In 2015, CCI acquired Morgan Stanley's Global Oil Merchanting business, creating one of the world's largest independent energy merchants. Dubin was the non-executive chairman, and remains a member of the board of directors and the firm’s lead shareholder.

Philanthropy and donations
In 1987, Dubin was asked by his fellow hedge fund manager and friend Paul Tudor Jones to join him and Peter Borish in a venture philanthropy project Jones had conceived and started. The resulting Robin Hood Foundation has raised and granted more than $3 billion to fight poverty in New York City. Dubin has served on the board since its founding, is a former Board Chair, and sits on the Jobs and Economic Security subcommittee.

In 2010, Dubin established the Dubin Fellowship for Emerging Leaders at the Center for Public Leadership, an academic research center at Harvard Kennedy School, with a $5 million gift. He had formed a relationship with the school two years prior while speaking before the school's students. The fellowship provides tuition for up to ten students each year. Dubin also serves on the Kennedy School's Dean's Executive Committee.

In 2010, the Dubin family donated $4.3 million to Stony Brook University towards the creation of the Dubin Family Athletic Performance Center in the Stony Brook Indoor Sports Complex. In 2015, the Dubin family donated $5 million towards the creation of Stony Brook University's Indoor Training Facility, which opened in 2020.

Dubin is a trustee of the Mt. Sinai Medical Center. He and his wife funded the Dubin Breast Center of the Tisch Cancer Institute at Mount Sinai in 2010 to provide comprehensive integrated breast care in a patient-centered environment. The multidisciplinary Center is headed by Dr. Elisa Port.

On April 19, 2012, Dubin and his wife Eva signed The Giving Pledge, created by Bill Gates and Warren Buffett. The commitment of the pledge is to give away at least 50% of their wealth to charity within their lifetime.

Personal life
In 1994, Dubin married Eva Andersson-Dubin and the couple has three children, two daughters and one son, Celina, Maya and Jordan. He first saw Eva on the New York Post's Page Six in a modeling photo.

The Dubins live in Manhattan and own property in Colorado's Gunnison County as well as in Sweden.

Dubin and Jeffrey Epstein

There are several connections between Dubin and Jeffrey Epstein. Epstein invested millions in Dubin's hedge fund and helped JPMorgan acquire Dubin's firm. Epstein had dated Dubin's wife, Eva Andersson for nearly a decade starting in the 1980s and the Dubins continued to maintain a close friendship with Epstein, traveling on his private jets, vacationing together with their families and visiting each other's homes frequently, including after Epstein's arrest for sex trafficking in 2006. In 2015, Virginia Roberts Giuffre alleged in a lawsuit against Ghislaine Maxwell that Maxwell had "directed [her to] have sex with" Dubin. Giuffre did not allege that she had in fact had sex with Dubin.

References

1957 births
Living people
21st-century philanthropists
American billionaires
American business executives
American financiers
American hedge fund managers
American investors
American people of Austrian-Jewish descent
American people of Russian-Jewish descent
Businesspeople from New York City
EF Hutton people
Giving Pledgers
Jeffrey Epstein
People from Washington Heights, Manhattan
Stony Brook University alumni